This table displays the top-rated primetime television series of the 2004–05 season as measured by Nielsen Media Research.

References

2004 in American television
2005 in American television
2004-related lists
2005-related lists
Lists of American television series